Novokayakent (Yañı Qayagent) is a village in Dagestan Republic. It is the administrative centre of Kayakentsky District.

Rural localities in Kayakentsky District